Ceryx morobeensis is a moth of the subfamily Arctiinae. It was described by Obraztsov in 1957. It is found in New Guinea.

The wings are hyaline (glass like), with black borders and veins.

References

Ceryx (moth)
Moths described in 1957